Jean Marc Jafet (born May 8, 1956) is a French bassist and composer. He is considered one of the top bassists in France.

Biography 
Jean-Marc Jafet was born  on May 8, 1956 in Nice, France, to guitarist father and mother singer.
JM Jafet started drumming in the 65/70. He then changed his instrument and became a bassist in 1978 to perform with the Brazilian duo "Les Etoiles". He is one of the most famous, recorded and in-demand electric bass players in France, and known for his work with Sylvain Luc, André Ceccarelli, Didier Lockwood, Biréli Lagrène, Michel Petrucciani and many others.

Discography

Leader
 1985: Dolores  
 1994: Agora 
 1996: Live au Parc Floral   
 2000: Douceur Lunaire  
 2004: Mes Anges
 2007: Live Moments   
 2017: Le Meilleur Moment du Monde

With Michel Jonasz
 2005: La Femme Du Parfumeur

With Marcia Maria
 1985: Colo De Rio

With Richard Galliano
 1999: Spleen

With Trio Sud
 2000: Sud
 2002: Trio Sud
 2008: Young & Fine

Compilations
 2009: A La Costa Sud, Edizioni Musicali Curci
 2011: Montecarlo - Life Night & Day, h.squared / Halidon

References

1956 births
Living people
French bass guitarists
Male bass guitarists
French jazz musicians
French composers
French male jazz musicians
Orchestre National de Jazz members
French male guitarists